Teodora Alexandrova (born September 24, 1981, in Sofia, Bulgaria) is a former Bulgarian individual rhythmic gymnast. She started rhythmic gymnastics in 1986.

Trained at the Levski club by Neshka Robeva, Alexandrova was a promising junior and the 1995 European junior champion. She competed at the 1997 and 1999 World Championships, finishing 6th and 8th in the all-around finals, and at the 1998 and 2000 European Championships. A broken leg prevented her from competing at the Olympics. The Bulgarian Federation replaced her with Iva Tepeshanova. She stopped her career soon after recovering from her injury.

References

External links
 

1981 births
Living people
Bulgarian rhythmic gymnasts